Sky Dragon or Sky Dragons may refer to:

 Sky Dragon, a 1949 Charlie Chan mystery film
 Sky Dragons, a 2012 Dragonriders of Pern novel by Anne McCaffrey and Todd McCaffrey
 Stephen Tse, whose gang nickname was Sky Dragon

See also
 Dragons of the Highlord Skies, a 2007 fantasy novel by Margaret Weis and Tracy Hickman
 Sky Dragon of Osiris, one of the three Egyptian God cards in Japanese manga series Yu-Gi-Oh!
 Sky Dragon 50, a Chinese air defence system